Sanjay Sukhanand Hazare (born 18 February 1961) is an Indian former cricketer who became an umpire after retiring as a player.

Early life
He was born in Vadodara, Gujarat in 1961. Several members of his family have been cricket players; his uncle Vijay Hazare was an Indian cricket captain.

Playing career
Hazare played 48 First-class matches and six List A matches for Baroda between 1981 and 1998.

Umpiring career
He is currently a cricket umpire, who has umpired five One Day Internationals, one Twenty20 International match and 16 Indian Premier League matches.

He was dropped from the IPL 2014 following his not-out decision on Pieterson against Rajasthan

Sanjay Hazare is the first International umpire from Vadodara, and second from Gujarat after Amish Saheba. He has served as a TV umpire in three Test matches, and has been a reserve umpire in one test match. He has also acted as a TV umpire in 12 ODIs and in one T20I; and as reserve umpire in one ODI.

International Cricket Council (ICC) made him a part of the International Panel of ICC Umpires on 2 August 2009. Samarjitsinh Gaekwad, the then vice-president of the Board of Control for Cricket in India (BCCI), said, "Hazare has a good umpiring record and his name was discussed during the meet of umpires committee of BCCI. He was selected considering his talent and we are proud to have an international umpire with us now." About his selection, Hazare said,"It is due to the efforts of senior Baroda Cricket Association (BCA) officials that I made it to the panel," adding,"I have been conveyed about my selection by BCA authorities, but I am yet to receive official letter from BCCI." However the BCCI didn't recommended his name for the 2011 cricket season, citing his performance, which was evaluated by the match referees of the ICC.

See also
 List of One Day International cricket umpires
 List of Twenty20 International cricket umpires

References

External links
Sanjay Hazare at ESPNcricinfo
Sanjay Hazare at CricketArchive

1961 births
Living people
Indian cricket umpires
Indian One Day International cricket umpires
Indian Twenty20 International cricket umpires
Baroda cricketers
West Zone cricketers
Indian cricketers